Stenoma inardescens is a moth of the family Depressariidae. It is found in Amazonas, Brazil.

The wingspan is 22–23 mm. The forewings are violet fuscous with a transverse dark brown spot on the end of the cell, sometimes broken into two, the upper part centred brownish ochreous. The hindwings are dark grey.

References

Moths described in 1925
Taxa named by Edward Meyrick
Stenoma